Rocky is a 1981 Indian romantic action film directed by Sunil Dutt. This film marks the debut of Sunil Dutt's son Sanjay Dutt and also stars Reena Roy, Tina Munim, Amjad Khan, Raakhee, Ranjeet, Shakti Kapoor and Aruna Irani in pivotal roles. Sunil Dutt also appears in a cameo. Aruna Irani received a Filmfare Nomination for Best Supporting Actress, the only nomination for the film.

Shammi Kapoor plays himself, where he gets to judge dancers to the famous song "Aa Dekhe Zara", where Sanjay Dutt and Reena Roy as a pair compete against Shakti Kapoor and Tina Munim. The film was released only a few days after the death of Sunil's wife and Sanjay's mother, Nargis. It was ranked as the 10th highest-grossing film of 1981.

Plot
Shankar (Sunil Dutt) is an educated young man who is employed in the construction business by Ratanlal (Anwar Hussain). Shankar is also the union leader and would like Ratanlal to enforce measures for workers' safety. Before he could ensure this, Shankar is accidentally killed in a work-related accident, leaving behind his wife, Parvati (Raakhee), and young son, Rakesh. Rakesh is in trauma because of this incident, and this trauma is repeated in his mind every time his mother comes near him. Parvati is instructed to keep away from Rakesh, and Rakesh is adopted by Robert (Amjad Khan) and his wife, Kathy (Aruna Irani) and they rename him, Rocky.

Years later, Rocky (Sanjay Dutt) has grown up without knowing who his biological mother is. Rocky's lifestyle is carefree until he falls in love with Renuka (Tina Munim). It is then that he learns that he is really Rakesh and that his mother is still alive, and his father did not die accidentally but was murdered. Rocky sets out to avenge his father's death. He gets help from a rape survivor (Reena Roy). But he doesn't know that his days, along with those of his near and dear ones, may also be numbered.

Cast
 Sanjay Dutt as Rakesh / Rocky D'Souza
Sunil Dutt as Shankar (Guest appearance), Rakesh's biological father
 Reena Roy	as Lajwanti / Hirabai
 Tina Munim as Renuka Seth
 Ranjeet as Jagdish aka "J.D."
 Aruna Irani as Kathy D'Souza
 Shakti Kapoor as R.D.
 Amjad Khan as Robert D'Souza, Rocky's adopted father
 Raakhee as Parvati, Rakesh's biological mother 
 Shashikala as Sophia
 Iftekhar as Dr. Bhagwandas
 Satyen Kappu as Ram Avtar
 Anwar Hussain as Ratanlal
 Agha as Professor
 C.S. Dubey as man at the courtesan's place
 Shiv Kumar as Advocate Sharma
 Keshto Mukherjee as Drunk Driver
 Jalal Agha as himself
 Sudha Chopra as Dugganjaan
 Gulshan Grover as Jagga
 Shammi Kapoor as himself (Cameo role)
 Chunky Pandey as Boy ringing the bell in the classroom (Cameo role)

Music
The music for the film is composed by R. D. Burman and the lyrics are written by Anand Bakshi where the songs continue to be popular even today. "Kya Yehi Pyar Hai" was inspired by R.D. Burman's Bengali number "Eki Bhalobasha" & also Amit Kumar song separately "Jeona Jeona" also composed by R.D.Burman. "Aa Dekhe Zara", "Hum Tumse Mile" and "Kya Yahi Pyar Hai" emerged as hits. It has a Telugu version of Rocky (1987).

References

External links
 

1980s Hindi-language films
1981 films
Films scored by R. D. Burman
Films directed by Sunil Dutt